The Damned Lovers (French: Les amants maudits) is a 1952 French crime film directed by Willy Rozier and starring Robert Berri,  Jacques Dynam and Ginette Baudin. A film noir it has been described as post-Liberation French Bonnie and Clyde story". It attracted audiences of around 1.1 million at the French domestic box office.

Synopsis
A cafe waiter reads crime novels and dreams of being a somebody. In order to impress his girlfriend he steals a car and becomes a real-life gangster.

Cast
 Danièle Roy as 	Jacky
 Robert Berri as 	Paul Morelli
 Denise Cardi as 	Maryse
 Jacques Dynam as 	Raoul
 René Alié as 	Giaccomidi
 Ginette Baudin as Tamara
 Georges Tourreil as  Le directeur de la PJ
 Jean Lara as 	 le directeur de Sport-Films	
 Maurice Bénard as  l'inspecteur Mavraux
 Marco Villa as Dédé
 Milly Mathis	as 	 La marseillaise
 Yves Furet as Léo

References

Bibliography
Walker-Morrison, Deborah. Classic French Noir: Gender and the Cinema of Fatal Desire. Bloomsbury Publishing, 2020.

External links 
 

1952 films
1952 crime films
French crime films
1950s French-language films
Films directed by Willy Rozier
Films set in Paris
1950s French films